Western Standard Time is the tenth studio album by American country band Asleep at the Wheel. Recorded at various studios in Austin, Dallas, Briarcliff and San Marcos, Texas it was produced solely by the band's frontman Ray Benson and released in August 1988 as the group's second album back on Epic Records. Western Standard Time is the band's first album to feature no original material, relying on recordings of compositions originally by popular swing, R&B and big band artists.

Asleep at the Wheel remained with Epic following the commercial success of its 1987 ninth studio album 10, which reached the top 20 of the US Billboard Top Country Albums chart and spawned four charting singles. After one lineup change, Jon Mitchell taking over from bassist David Dawson, the group recorded the album's follow-up in 1988. The first two singles from Western Standard Time – "Walk on By" and "Hot Rod Lincoln" – registered on the Billboard Hot Country Singles chart.

Western Standard Time received mixed reviews from critics. Several commentators praised the band's choice of songs to record on the album, which were described as "fun" and "light-hearted". However, other writers criticised the lack of original compositions and dismissed the cover versions as merely "novelties". The album was Asleep at the Wheel's fourth release to reach the top 40 of the Billboard Top Country Albums chart, peaking at number 34 and selling over 100,000 copies.

Background
Following the release and touring in promotion of 10, bassist David Dawson was replaced by Jon Mitchell in the summer of 1988. He made his debut for the band on Western Standard Time, which was released by Epic in the first week of August 1988. The album's recording of Leroy Van Dyke's "Walk on By" was issued as its first single in June, reaching number 57 on the US Billboard Hot Country Singles chart. "Hot Rod Lincoln", originally recorded by Arkie Shibley, followed in October and peaked at number 65 on the chart. "Chattanooga Choo Choo" was issued as the final single from the album in March 1989.

Reception

Commercial
Western Standard Time debuted on the US Billboard Top Country Albums chart at number 57 in September 1988. The following month, it peaked at number 34. The album reached number 36 on the Cash Box equivalent chart. Western Standard Time reportedly sold approximately 100,000 copies.

Critical

Media response to Western Standard Time was generally positive. Chicago Tribune columnist Jack Hurst wrote that "This is the kind of sound that gets your blood racing-and in a most pleasurable, nostalgic kind of way," praising the band's "individualistic renditions of 10 oldies but goodies". British publication Music Week described the collection as an "undemandingly pleasant album of standards of the [country] genre", while the Detroit Free Press dubbed it "Fabulous, light-hearted stuff for retro fans." Similarly, New York Daily News published a review stating that "It's like plugging in a 1940s jukebox ... a Saturday-night sound that's both rowdy and respectful." AllMusic's Mark A. Humphrey gave the album four and a half out of five stars and simply wrote, "Nicely done Western standards."

Billboard magazine agreed that "[the] album does well resurrecting such light fare as "Chattanooga Choo Choo," "Hot Rod Lincoln," and "That's What I Like About The South,"" but retorted with the claim that "it flops in trying to revive "That Lucky Old Sun," "Walk On By," and other serious numbers." The Asbury Park Press shared a concern along similar lines, but criticised the "shameless novelty tunes" (including "Chattanooga Choo Choo" to "Hot Rod Lincoln") as "embarrassing", and hailed the "reworked country classics" (such as "Walk on By" and "Walking the Floor Over You") as "a lot of fun". A review in the Pottsville Republican was similarly mixed, admitting the album had "limitations" but praising several of its songs.

Accolades
Western Standard Time earned Asleep at the Wheel its third Grammy Award, and the third for Best Country Instrumental Performance, which it won for "Sugarfoot Rag".

Track listing

Personnel

Asleep at the Wheel
Ray Benson – guitar, vocals, six-string bass, string arrangements, production, engineering
John Ely – pedal and Hawaiian steel guitars
Jon Mitchell – bass
Tim Alexander – piano, vocals, string arrangements
David Sanger – drums
Larry Franklin – fiddle, guitar, vocals
Michael Francis – saxophone
Guest musicians
Chris O'Connell – vocals
Larry Seyer – rhythm guitar, vocals, bass , engineering, mixing
Tony Garnier – upright and six-string bass
Johnny Gimble – fiddle, mandolin, vocals
Willie Nelson – vocals 

Production personnel
Spencer Starnes – engineering
Larry Greenhill – engineering
Bobby Arnold – engineering
Chris Hammond – engineering
Gary Higginbotham – engineering
Gary Powell – engineering
Marty Lewis – mixing
Denny Purcell – mastering
Additional personnel
Bill Johnson – art direction
Peter DeLory – artwork, photography

Charts

References

External links

Asleep at the Wheel albums
1988 albums
Epic Records albums